Tupiniquins Ecological Station is a coastal marine ecological station on the coast of São Paulo State, Brazil.

Location

The Tupiniquins Ecological Station is a coastal marine area of  that was created on 21 July 1986.
It is administered by the Chico Mendes Institute for Biodiversity Conservation.
It is in the municipalities of Cananéia, Itanhaém and Peruíbe in São Paulo State.
The unit includes the following islands and islets:

Conservation and environment

The Ecological Station is a "strict nature reserve" under IUCN protected area category Ia.
The purpose is to conserve nature and support research.
Vegetation is from the Atlantic Forest biome with plants typical of salt marshes, sandy ridges, plains and continental beaches.
Migratory bird species included royal tern (thalasseus maximus), Sandwich tern (Thalasseus sandvicensis), South American tern (sterna hirundinacea) and peregrine falcon (falco peregrinus).
The conservation unit is part of the Lagamar mosaic.

References

Sources

1986 establishments in Brazil
Ecological stations of Brazil
Protected areas of São Paulo (state)
Protected areas established in 1986
Protected areas of the Atlantic Forest